Garden of the Dead (also known as Tomb of the Undead) is a 1972 horror film directed by low-budget film director John Hayes and stars Phil Kenneally, Duncan McLeod, Lee Frost and Susan Charney.

Plot
A group of prison inmates in a chain gang obtain some experimental formaldehyde, and get high off of it. They later try to escape and are shot dead. They are buried, and rise again to kill everyone in their path, and to find more formaldehyde from which to get high.

Cast
 Phil Kenneally as Warden
 Duncan McLeod as Dr. Saunders
 John Dullaghan as Sgt. Burns
 John Dennis as Jablonski
 Susan Charney as Carol Johnson
 Marland Proctor as Paul Johnson
 Tony Vorno as Mitchell
 Lee Frost as McGee
 Virgil Frye as Braddock
 Jerome Guardino as Gravedigger

Release
The film premiered in August 1972, and was later distributed on VHS by Troma Entertainment. In 2004, it was featured on a 3-in-1 Troma DVD.  In 2006, Troma released it as part of a 15-in-1 pack.

Reception
Writing in The Zombie Movie Encyclopedia, academic Peter Dendle said, "This scruffy low-budget production anticipates the pointless and depressing amateur zombie movies of the early '90s by almost twenty years."  Glenn Kay, who wrote Zombie Movies: The Ultimate Guide, said, "It's all incredibly silly, campy stuff."  On Evil Dread, the website rated Garden of the Dead 2/10 stars.

Bloody Disgusting included the film's poster in their list of the best posters for bad films.

See also
 List of American films of 1972

References

External links
 

1972 films
1972 horror films
American independent films
American zombie films
Films shot in California
Troma Entertainment films
1970s English-language films
Films directed by John Hayes
1970s American films